USC Rip City is a NBL1 North club based in Sunshine Coast, Queensland. The club fields a team in both the Men's and Women's NBL1 North. The club is a division of the University of the Sunshine Coast Basketball Association (USCBA), one of two major administrative basketball organisations in the region, the other being Sunshine Coast Basketball Association. The Rip play their home games at USC Stadium.

Club history

Background
The USCBA was established in July 2008, and by 2009, the association placed its first junior team into Basketball Queensland's representative competitions—BQJBC and BQ State Championships. In 2014, the association entered both a men's and women's team into the Southern Basketball League (SBL) under the name of Sunshine Coast Rip. While the Rip women failed to make the playoffs in their first season, the men made it through to the SBL Division 2 grand final, where they defeated the Noosa Cyclones 81–65. In 2015, the women again failed to make the playoffs, while the men were knocked out in the semi-finals.

QBL / NBL1 North
In October 2015, the Sunshine Coast Rip were granted a license to play in the Queensland Basketball League in 2016, with both a men's and women's team entering. In their first QBL season, both teams failed to make a playoff berth, with the men finishing 11th with a 5–12 record, while the women finished 12th with a 4–13 record. For the 2017 season, the club was renamed USC Rip City.

For the 2020 season, USC Rip City joined the newly-established NBL1 North, which replaced the QBL. In 2022, the men's team reached the NBL1 North Grand Final, where they lost the best-of-three series 2–0 to the Gold Coast Rollers.

References

External links
Rip City Basketball's official website
2014 SBL Award Winners

2016 establishments in Australia
Basketball teams established in 2016
Basketball teams in Queensland
Queensland Basketball League teams
Sport in the Sunshine Coast, Queensland
University and college sports clubs in Australia
University of the Sunshine Coast